Geeknet, Inc. is a Fairfax County, Virginia–based company that is a subsidiary of GameStop. The company was formerly known as VA Research, VA Linux Systems, VA Software, and SourceForge, Inc.

History

VA Research
VA Research was founded in November 1993 by Stanford University graduate student Larry Augustin and James Vera.  Augustin was a Stanford colleague of Jerry Yang and David Filo, the founders of Yahoo!.  VA Research was one of the first vendors to build and sell personal computer systems installed with the Linux operating system, as an alternative to more expensive Unix workstations that were available at the time. During its initial years of operation, the business was profitable and grew quickly, with over $100 million in sales and a 10% profit margin in 1998. It was the largest vendor of pre-installed Linux computers, with approximately 20% of the Linux hardware market.

In October 1998, the company received investments of $5.4 million from Intel and Sequoia Capital.

In March and April 1999, VA Research purchased Enlightenment Solutions, marketing company Electric Lichen L.L.C., and VA's top competitor, Linux Hardware Solutions.  That year, VA Research also won a business-plan competition for the right to operate the linux.com domain.   In May 1999, VA created a Linux Labs division, hiring former linux.com domain holder and programmer Fred van Kempen, and programmers Jon "maddog" Hall, Geoff "Mandrake" Harrison, Jeremy Allison, Richard Morrell (who would later create Smoothwall as a project at VA Linux) and San "nettwerk" Mehat. In the summer of 1999, programmers Tony Guntharp, Uriah Welcome, Tim Perdue and Drew Streib began designing and developing SourceForge. SourceForge was released to the public at Comdex on November 17, 1999. VA began porting Linux to the new IA-64 processor architecture in earnest. Intel and Sequoia, along with Silicon Graphics and other investors, added an additional $25 million investment in June 1999.

Initial public offering

The company's largest customers included Akamai Technologies and eToys.

The company changed its name to VA Linux Systems. On December 9, 1999, the company became a public company via an initial public offering. The company raised $132 million, offering shares at $30/share, but the shares opened for trading at $299/share, before closing at $239.25/share, or 698% above the IPO price, breaking a record for the largest first day gain. Larry Augustin, the 38-year old founder and chief executive officer of the company, became a billionaire on paper and a 26-year old web developer at the company said she was worth $10 million on paper. By August 2000, the shares were trading at $40 each and only 24 mutual funds held the stock. On December 8, 2000, one year later, after the bursting of the dot com bubble, shares traded at $8.49/share. In January 2001, the stock traded at $7.13/share. By December 2002, it was worth just $1.19/share.

Acquisition of Andover.net
On February 3, 2000, the company announced that it was acquiring Andover.net for $800 million, a month after it became a public company. This acquisition gave VA Linux popular online media properties such as Slashdot, Andover News Network, Freshmeat, NewsForge (became a mirror of linux.com in 2007, mirrors geeknet.com since 2010), linux.com, ThinkGeek, and a variety of online software development resources. With this acquisition came a stable of writers such as Rob Malda, Robin Miller (Roblimo), Jack Bryar, Rod Amis, Jon Katz, and "CowboyNeal". The acquisition eventually allowed the company to shift its business model from Linux-based product sales to specialty media and software development support.

Japanese partnership
In September 2000, in partnership with Sumitomo Corporation, the company created a Japanese subsidiary, VA Linux Systems Japan KK, to promote Linux systems in Japan.

Sales growth
The company's sales grew to $17.7 million in 1999, up from $5.5 million in fiscal 1998. In fiscal 2000, the company's sales were $120.3 million.

VA Software
By 2001, VA Linux's original equipment and systems business model encountered stiff competition from other hardware vendors, such as Dell, that now offered Linux as a pre-installed operating system.

On June 26, 2001, VA Linux decided that it would leave the systems-hardware business and focus on software development. During the summer of 2001, all 153 of the hardware-focused employees were dismissed as a result of this shift in the company's business model.

On December 6, 2001, the company formally changed its name to VA Software, recognizing that the majority of the business was now software development and specialty news and information services. However, the company's Japanese subsidiary still uses the name "VA Linux Systems Japan K.K."

On January 2, 2002, the company's stock price plunged 42% after an earnings warning.

SourceForge and OSDN

In December 2003, VA Software marketed a proprietary SourceForge Enterprise Edition, re-written in Java for offshore outsourcing software development.

By April 2004, the company focused on SourceForge, an online software application, and OSDN, a group of websites catering to people in the information technology and software development industries, which was renamed to Open Source Technology Group (OSTG). At that time, the stock was trading at $1.94/share.

In January 2006, VA Software sold Animation Factory to Jupitermedia Corporation.

On April 24, 2007, the company sold SourceForge Enterprise Edition to CollabNet.

On May 24, 2007, VA Software changed its name to SourceForge Inc. and merged with OSTG.

On January 5, 2009, Scott Kauffman was appointed president and chief executive officer of SourceForge.

Geeknet
In November 2009, SourceForge, Inc. changed its name to Geeknet, Inc.

Geeknet president and chief executive officer Scott Kauffman resigned on August 4, 2010, and was replaced by executive chairman Kenneth Langone and the company changed its ticker symbol to GKNT.

On August 10, 2010, Jason Baird, the chief operations officer, and Michael Rudolph, the chief marketing officer resigned, both effective 31 August 2010. Jay Seirmarco, the chief technology officer also resigned, effective September 30, 2010.

Effective January 31, 2011, Geeknet appointed Matthew C. Blank, former chief executive officer and chairman of Showtime Networks as a member of its board of directors.

Later in 2011, the company renamed its Freshmeat website to Freecode.

In September 2012, Slashdot, SourceForge, and Freecode were sold to Dice Holdings for $20 million, leaving ThinkGeek as the sole property of Geeknet.

On May 26, 2015, it was announced that pop culture-oriented retailer Hot Topic had made an offer to acquire Geeknet for $17.50 per-share, valuing the company at $122 million. However, on May 29, 2015, it was revealed that an unspecified company had made a counter-offer of $20 per-share; Hot Topic was given until June 1, 2015, to exceed this new offer. On June 2, 2015, it was announced that video game retail chain GameStop would acquire Geeknet for $140 million, paying $20 per share. The deal closed on July 17, 2015.

References

External links
 
 VA Linux Systems Japan K.K.

 
1993 establishments in California
2015 disestablishments in California
1993 establishments in Virginia
2015 disestablishments in Virginia
1999 initial public offerings
2015 mergers and acquisitions
American companies established in 1993
American companies disestablished in 2015
Companies based in Fairfax County, Virginia
Computer companies established in 1993
Computer companies disestablished in 2015
Defunct computer companies of the United States
Defunct software companies of the United States
GameStop
Linux companies
Online publishing companies of the United States
Online retailers of the United States
Retail companies established in 1993
Software companies based in Virginia
Software companies established in 1993
Software companies disestablished in 2015